Filmtracks.com is a modern film score review website created and maintained by its sole reviewer, Christian Clemmensen.  Since the launch of Filmtracks in 1996, the website has reviewed nearly two-thousand soundtracks dating as far back as 1954, though the website's focus is primarily those composed after 1975. Filmtracks also has a forum.

Accolades
In February 1998, Filmtracks was highly recommended to film music fans by Lukas Kendall at Film Score Monthly.  In October 2000, Entertainment Weekly Erin Podolsky gave the website an 'A' rating and called it "A MUST-VISIT".  In April 2001, Filmtracks was also named Associate of the Month by Amazon.com.

Filmtracks Awards

Best Film Score

References

External links

Internet properties established in 1996
American music websites
Soundtrack mass media